Perama is a suburb of Piraeus. It is part of Athens urban area and belogs to the Piraeus regional unit. It lies on the southwest edge of the Aegaleo mountains, on the Saronic Gulf coast. It is 8 km northwest of Piraeus, and 14 km west of Athens city centre. The municipality has an area of 14.729 km2. It forms the western terminus of the Port of Piraeus, and there is also a passenger port that provides ferry services to Salamis Island.

The name Perama comes from the Greek word "perasma" which means "passage". Perama has a secondary soccer team named Peramaikos. The Battle of Salamis which took place in 480BC was located between the Salamis island and the mainland, part of which included Perama.

Historical population

See also
List of settlements in Attica

References

External links
Official website 

Municipalities of Attica
Populated places in Piraeus (regional unit)